In 1968 the British Lions toured South Africa. The tour was not successful in terms of international results, the Lions losing the Test series against South Africa by three matches to nil, with the other match drawn. The Lions won 15 of their 16 non-international matches, losing only to Transvaal. The touring party was captained by Tom Kiernan, coached by Ronnie Dawson and managed by David Brooks. Star back Barry John broke his collar bone in a dangerous tackle in the first Test.

As well as South Africa, games were played against South West Africa (the future Namibia, then part of South Africa) and Rhodesia (the future Zimbabwe).

Unlike the previous two tours to South Africa (1955 and 1962), this British Lions team did not stop off in Nairobi, Kenya, to play East Africa on the way home. However, one member of this tour party was later to play against that team; in 1975 Peter Stagg was living in Zambia and playing rugby for the Ndola Wanderers RFC when the Tuskers visited and he played for Zambia in their first international on 31 August 1975 at Kitwe. Six of the squad would ultimately change codes and play professional rugby league, they are; Mike Coulman, Ken Goodall, Keith Jarrett, Keri Jones, Maurice Richards, and Bryan West.

Squad
Backs: 

Barry Bresnihan (University College Dublin and Ireland)
Gordon Connell (Trinity Academicals and Scotland)
Gerald Davies (Cardiff and Wales)
Gareth Edwards (Cardiff and Wales)
Mike Gibson (North of Ireland FC and Ireland)
Bob Hiller (Harlequins and England)
Sandy Hinshelwood (London Scottish and Scotland)
Keith Jarrett (Newport and Wales)
Barry John (Cardiff and Wales)
Keri Jones (Cardiff and Wales)
Tom Kiernan (capt) (Cork Constitution and Ireland)
Billy Raybould (London Welsh and Wales)
Maurice Richards (Cardiff and Wales)
Keith Savage (Northampton and England)
Jock Turner (Gala and Scotland)
Roger Young (Queen's University RFC and Ireland)

Forwards: 

Rodger Arneil (Edinburgh Academicals and Scotland)
Mike Coulman (Moseley and England)
Mick Doyle (Blackrock College and Ireland)
Ken Goodall (City of Derry and Ireland)
Tony Horton (Blackheath and England)
Peter Larter (Northampton and England)
Willie John McBride (Ballymena and Ireland)
Syd Millar (Ballymena and Ireland)
John O'Shea (Cardiff and Wales)
John Pullin (Bristol and England)
Peter Stagg (Sale and Scotland)
John Taylor (London Welsh and Wales)
Bob Taylor (Northampton and England)
Jim Telfer (Melrose and Scotland)
Delme Thomas (Llanelli and Wales)
Bryan West (Northampton and England)
Jeff Young (Harrogate and Wales)

Bob Lloyd (Harlequins and England) was selected in the original touring team but had to withdraw because of exam commitments and was replaced by Jarrett.

Results

References

Bibliography

British Lions tour
British & Irish Lions tours of South Africa
Rugby union tours of Zimbabwe
Rugby union tours of Namibia
tour british
Tour british
Tour british
Tour british
Tour british
1967–68 in Irish rugby union